The Bayer designation ι Normae, which is Latinized as Iota Normae and abbreviated ι Nor, is shared by two stars in the southern constellation of Norma:
ι1 Normae
ι2 Normae
The pair form a double star that can be viewed with a small telescope.

References

Normae, Iota
Norma (constellation)